The guitarra séptima or guitarra sétima is a Mexican guitar with fourteen strings, strung in seven double courses. This guitar is smaller than a six-string guitar and also has less resonance. It had popularity in the 19th century. Some manuscripts have been found, like the one by Antonio Vargas, of 1776 in Veracruz, where a seven double-course guitar is mentioned, as well as methods by José Guarro and Guillermo Gómez.

See also
Russian guitar
Seven string guitar

References

External links 
 Video Youtube - Marcha Fúnebre para guitarra séptima

Guitars
Mexican musical instruments